Scoparia rufostigma is a moth in the family Crambidae. It was described by George Hampson in 1891. It is found in India's Nilgiri Mountains.

References

Moths described in 1891
Scorparia